Shehu Sule College of Nursing and Midwifery, Damaturu is a state-owned health institution situated in Damaturu, the capital city of Yobe State. It was established in 1993.

Courses
The college offers the following courses
 Nursing
 Midwifery

References

Nursing in Nigeria
Midwifery in Nigeria
1993 establishments in Nigeria